Comeback is a Czech television sitcom that premiered on TV Nova on 4 September 2008.

Synopsis
The sitcom revolves around Tomáš Pacovský (Tomáš Matonoha), owner of a music store named U Dvou Akordů (At the Two Chords), and his family. His brother Ozzák (Martin Dejdar) (the name 'Ozzák' is an allusion to an Ozzy Osbourne fan) is a chronic alcoholic who loves heavy metal music. The majority of jokes and gags are about his alcoholism and his absolute belief in metal music. Ozzák professes this opinion: Music which isn't related (more or less) to metal is trash, and not worth selling, but metal is the real deal, and so it should be given away for free. Tomáš has a teenage daughter Iva (Kristýna Leichtová) who is (seemingly) the only normal member of the family, although she has her funny moments as well.

Other characters include members of the Bůček family: Simona (Simona Babčáková), a slightly odd, middle-aged woman with a very hooked nose, who works in a pub named U Jezevce (At the Badger's) in the first season, where Ozzák spends most of his free time and money. She has two children. They are neighbours of the Pacovský family. Lexa (Matouš Ruml) is an unintelligent boy who is in love (albeit platonically) with Iva. Lexa also admires Ozzák and does everything Ozzák says. Saša (Marie Doležalová) is a very quiet girl who sometimes thinks of herself as invisible. One of her personality quirks, for example, is that whenever she tries to lie, she faints. The Buček family are very poor and Simone often takes drastic measures to keep them in the black.

The last main character is Marcela (Dana Batulková). Her husband is Zoran Divić, a gangster from Croatia, and a big fan of HNK Hajduk Split soccer team and Tomi Paci. She helps in Tomáš' store as a volunteer, because music is her hobby. Marcela disapproves of Ozzák's long hair and his love of heavy metal music and sometimes she refuses to work with him. It may seem that she doesn't like Ozzák, but she actually develops a kind of relationship with him.

Cast and characters
 Tomáš Matonoha as Tomáš Pacovský aka Tomi Paci
 Martin Dejdar as František "Ozzák" Pacovský
 Dana Batulková as Marcela Divić
 Kristýna Leichtová as Iva Pacovská
 Matouš Ruml as Alexandr "Lexa" Bůček
 Marie Doležalová as Alexandra "Saša" Bůčková
 Simona Babčáková as Simona Bůčková

Special guests
 Karel Gott as himself (episode "Gott Ex Machina")
 Stanislav Hložek as himself (episode "Gott Ex Machina")
 Helena Vondráčková as herself (episode "Pomáhat a chránit")
 Vlastimil Harapes as himself (episode "Taneční")
 Tomáš Hanák as Zoran Divić (episode "Rozzvod")
 Marek Vašut as himself (episodes "Rozzvod" and "Bejk")
 Norbert Lichý as Otto Šlus (episode "Berňák")
 Tomáš Baldýnský as Zoran's bodyguard (episode "Rozzvod")
 Lucie Hadašová as Cover girl (episode "Rozzvod")
 Marie Pochobradská as Renata Machová (episode "Těžká hodina")
 Zuzana Bydžovská as Beer woman (episode "Absťák")
 Monika Žáková as Libuše Krobová (episodes "Souboj titánů", "Mrtvý muž")
 Eva Slovíková as Lexa's girl Dajana (episode "Je jaro")
 Jiří Hána as Robber (episode "Lupiči")
 Jana Plodková as Police officer (episode "Lupiči")
 Jitka Smutná as Robber (episode "Lupiči")
 Kamil Švejda as Exterminator (episode "Giganti")
 Leoš Noha as Plumber (episode "Zlatá rybka")
 Roman Štabrňák as Locksmith (episode "Zlatá rybka")
 Jitka Sedláčková as Social worker (episode "Simonina volba")
 Marie Málková as Firefighter (episode "CzechSteh")
 David Máj as Psychologist (episode "Mrtvý muž")
 Jakub Gottwald as Interpreter for the Dalai Lama (episode "Berňák")
 Jiří Bábek as Judge in cooking contest (episode "Koprovka")
 Marcela Nohýnková as Zoran's mum (episode "Koprovka")
 Nikol Kouklová as Girl in video (episode "Rozzvod")
 Lenka Loubalová as Opera singer (episode "Pan Prase odchází")
 Brutus as themselves (episode "Pan Prase odchází")
 Marcela Holubcová as Customer (episode "Krev, pop a slzy")
 Josef Polášek as Jaromír Šimara (episode "Děvečka z Lidečka", "Bez kláves neodejdu")
 Jana Holcová as Mrs. Veselá (episode "Děvečka z Lidečka")
 Pavla Tomicová as Woman (episode "Komu zvoní hrany")
 Ali Morovin as Italian contestant (episode "Zlatá ledvina")
 Eva Leinweberová as Job centre worker
 Štěpán Škorpil as Moderator (episode "Zlatá ledvina")
 Železný Zekon as himself (episode "Zlatá ledvina")
 Věra Kubánková as Neighbour Vojtíčková (episode "Boží frisbee")
 Andrea Černá as Dance teacher (episode "Sbohem, Káhiro")
 Karel Zima as Plumber (episode "Sbohem, Káhiro")
 Lucie Borhyová as Mother of Vašut's son (episode "Bejk")
 Vladimír Hrbek as Retired person (episode "Let mouchy")
 Jindřich Bonaventura as Neighbour Bajer (episode "Obraz paní Rybkové")
 Adam Halaš as Mime (episode "Sulc")
 Tomáš Legierski as Neighbour Roubal (episode "Sulc")

Episodes

Awards
 ANNO 2008 – 3rd place

References

External links
 Comeback on TV Nova
 

TV Nova (Czech TV channel) original programming
Czech comedy television series
2008 Czech television series debuts